Hemmens is a surname. Notable people with the surname include:

 DeAnne Hemmens (born 1964), American sprint canoeist
 Heather Hemmens (born 1988), American actress, director, and producer

See also
 Hemmen